Richard Wurster (born August 27, 1942) is an American speed skater. He competed in the men's 1500 metres event at the 1968 Winter Olympics.

References

1942 births
Living people
American male speed skaters
Olympic speed skaters of the United States
Speed skaters at the 1968 Winter Olympics
Sportspeople from Schenectady, New York